Murder at the Windmill, titled Mystery at the Burlesque in the United States, is a 1949 British crime film directed by Val Guest and featuring Garry Marsh, Jon Pertwee, and Peter Butterworth.

It was shot at Walton Studios and was the first film to show footage inside the Windmill Theatre.

Plot
A spectator is shot during a performance at London's Windmill Theatre, causing the Metropolitan police to investigate.

Cast
 Garry Marsh as Detective Inspector 
 Jon Pertwee as Detective Sergeant 
 Jack Livesey as Vivian Van Damm
 Eliot Makeham as Gimpy 
 Jimmy Edwards as Jimmy 
 Diana Decker as Frankie 
 Donald Clive as Donald 
 Jill Anstey as Patsy
 Peter Butterworth as Police Constable 
 Margo Johns as Box Office Girl

Critical reception
In the Radio Times, David McGillivray wrote, "partly filmed in situ, with performers and staff playing themselves, this creaky whodunnit is a valuable record, within the bounds of the strict censorship of the day, of the lowbrow songs and sketches that made the theatre famous. Jimmy Edwards's spot, dreadful now, was thought hilarious at the time, and won the whiskery comic his part in radio's celebrated Take It from Here" ; while TV Guide thought the film was "hampered by trite dialog and an easy solution," and "the mystery is little more than an excuse to film a few song and dance numbers. These are nicely staged and come off a good deal better than the investigation."

References

External links
 
 
 

1949 films
1949 crime films
1940s English-language films
Films directed by Val Guest
British crime films
Films shot at Nettlefold Studios
Films set in London
British black-and-white films
Films scored by Ronald Hanmer
1940s British films